Jean-Pierre Jouyet (born 13 February 1954) is a French civil servant. He was the ambassador of France to the United Kingdom between 2017 and 2019.

Biography
Jean-Pierre Jouyet was born on 13 February 1954 in Montreuil-sous-Bois in the suburbs of Paris.

His last political position is secrétaire général  of French President Hollande. Before that he was president of the Banque publique d'investissement (BPI) and general director of the Caisse des dépôts et consignations from 2012 to 2014, and
Chairman of the French securities regulator, the Autorité des Marchés Financiers (AMF), since 15 November 2008; immediately prior to which he was Minister of State, attached to the Minister of Foreign and European Affairs, responsible for European Affairs in the François Fillon government from May 2007.

Having graduated from Sciences Po, he then went on to study at France's most famous post graduate school, the École nationale d'administration (ÉNA) in the class of 1980 known as the "Promotion Voltaire".

After which, in accordance with the strict system of selection reserved for honours graduates of ENA in the French Administration he was to immediately be eligible for and become a member of the elite group of Inspecteurs des finances (auditor at the Ministry for the Economy and Finance, with special responsibility for the inspection of public finances), before taking a succession of senior posts such as Principal at the Service de la legislation fiscale (tax legislation department), and Principal Private Secretary of the Minister of Industry, Foreign Trade and Town and Country Planning until 1991 when he was called to serve (initially as Deputy and then Head of Cabinet of the President of the European Commission, Jacques Delors, President of the European Commission until 1995.

From 1995 until 1997, Jean-Pierre Jouyet was a partner in Jeantet & Co, a French business law firm, which he left at the request of the Prime Minister Lionel Jospin to become his Deputy Principal Private Secretary until 2000, during which he contributed to France's entry into the Euro Zone.

He was then to become Head of the French Trésor Directorate from 2000 until 2004, when Nicolas Sarkozy, who had been appointed Minister of Finance, requested him to become France's Ambassador for international economic affairs.

During his tenure as Head of the French Trésor Directorate, he was to also be the President of the Paris Club.

Briefly non-executive chairman of Barclays Bank France in 2005, he was then designated Head of the Inspection générale des finances within the Ministry of Finance until 2007, before subsequently being appointed Minister of State responsible for European Affairs in François Fillon's government. His mission was to make the necessary preparations for France's Presidency of the council of the European Union in the second half of 2008.

At the conclusion of this assignment, Jean-Pierre Jouyet was then nominated by President Sarkozy on 14 November 2008 to become Chairman of the French securities regulator, the AMF, to replace Michel Prada, at the end of his non-renewable 5-year mandate, on 15 December 2008.

Honorary President of the Club Témoin since 1999, and president of the Club Démocratie in 2000, he was to be one of the initiators and signatories of the petition which was to become known as "l'appel des Gracques" seeking an alliance between France's most important left wing party the Parti Socialiste and an important right wing party the UDF during the 2007 Presidential campaign.

Director of Studies at IEP from 1981 to 1988, he was to be a lecturer in 1996 and 1997, before becoming Associate Lecturer in 2006. JP Jouyet has also been a member of the Board of the National Foundation of Political Sciences since 2006.

He was master of Lectures at ENA in 1982, 2006 and 2007. He currently chairs a commission which is reviewing the system under which graduates are attributed posts within the French administration at the conclusion of their studies at the ENA.

Chairman of the supervisory board of the Aspen Institute since 18 May 2010, Jean-Pierre Jouyet is also a member of The Scientific Committee of the Bosphore Institute and one of the Patrons of the Collège des Bernardins.

Married to Brigitte Taittinger one of the grand daughters of Pierre Taittinger who founded the celebrated firm of champagne which bears his name. Brigitte Taittinger is herself the chair and CEO of Annick Goutal Perfumes.

Bibliography
He is the joint author with Philippe Mabille of Don't Bury France (N'enterrez pas la France) published in February 2007, before jointly penning with Sophie Coignard Une présidence de crises published in February 2009. 
He is also the author of Nous les avons tant aimés, published in February 2010.

References

1954 births
Living people
Ambassadors of France to the United Kingdom
Politicians of the French Fifth Republic
Sciences Po alumni
École nationale d'administration alumni
Inspection générale des finances (France)
Officiers of the Légion d'honneur
Commanders Crosses of the Order of Merit of the Federal Republic of Germany
Commanders of the Order of Merit of the Republic of Poland
People from Montreuil, Seine-Saint-Denis
François Hollande